The Cayuga–Seneca Canal is a canal in New York, United States. It is now part of the New York State Canal System.

The Cayuga–Seneca Canal connects the Erie Canal to Cayuga Lake and Seneca Lake.

History

The Seneca River, now the Cayuga–Seneca Canal, always has been an economic engine for the communities of Waterloo and Seneca Falls.   The Seneca Lock Navigation Co., a private enterprise formed in 1813, dammed three sets of rapids and installed locks to allow goods to be transported to the Erie Canal. In 1818, a canal was opened between Cayuga and Seneca Lakes. By 1823, an average of eight boats a day were passing through the lock at Waterloo, carrying flour, potash, pork, whiskey, lumber and wool and returning with other products and merchandise. Job Smith, Seneca Falls’ first businessman, opened a portage company on the eastern end of the river in 1787. The company transported travelers, boats and goods around a mile-long series
of rapids with a  drop known as “the Falls.”

The locks at Seneca Falls were completed in 1818. Improvements between the lakes, completed in 1821, made eight stone locks and nearly two miles of dug canal in addition to sections of the river. To further develop industry, the rapids were dammed to form the Upper, Middle and Lower Falls, and rapid industrialization began in 1825.

In 1825, a canal was begun to connect Seneca Lake with the newly constructed Erie Canal at Montezuma and the Cayuga–Seneca Canal was put into use in 1828. The Canal was enlarged in 1862, and the Flats, an area adjacent to and east of the village center, grew into a major industrial area, producing fire engines, hose carts and other firefighting equipment, pumps and other iron goods including stove parts, bootjacks, corn shellers, meat choppers, sausage stuffers, flatirons and bells. A knitting mill made socks and once produced 85,000 pairs of socks for the Army and Navy.

C-S Canal locks were modified in 1918 when New York State created the New York Barge Canal System. State engineers replaced five locks with a large two-flight lock - a  lift that required a great pool of water for their operation. This spelled the demise of the Flats. Buildings were destroyed or moved to create Van Cleef Lake. Flooding was completed on August 20, 1915.

Locks
The following list of locks is provided for the current canal, from east to west. There are a total of 4 locks on the Cayuga–Seneca Canal.

Overall sidewall height will vary by lock, ranging between  depending on the lift and navigable stages.

Distance is based on position markers from an interactive canal map provided online by the New York State Canal Corporation and may not exactly match specifications on signs posted along the canal. Mean surface elevations are comprised from a combination of older canal profiles and history books as well as specifications on signs posted along the canal. The margin of error should normally be within .

All surface elevations are approximate.

The Cayuga–Seneca Canal officially begins at the confluence of the Seneca and Clyde rivers near Mays Point.

References

External links
 Cruising Guide to the Cayuga-Seneca Canal
 Information and Boater's Guide to the New York State Canal System
 New York State Canals

Canals in New York (state)
Transportation buildings and structures in Seneca County, New York
Tourist attractions in Seneca County, New York
Finger Lakes
Canals opened in 1818